Boekhoudt is a surname. Notable people with the surname include:

Alfonso Boekhoudt (born 1965), Aruban politician
Alysha Boekhoudt (born 1993), Aruban model and beauty pageant titleholder

See also
Boekhout